The Crossing of the Red Sea forms an episode in the biblical narrative of The Exodus.

It tells of the escape of the Israelites, led by Moses, from the pursuing Egyptians, as recounted in the Book of Exodus. Moses holds out his staff and God parts the waters of the Yam Suph (Reed Sea). The Israelites walk on dry ground and cross the sea, followed by the Egyptian army. Once the Israelites have safely crossed, Moses drops his staff, closing the sea, and drowning the pursuing Egyptians.

Biblical narrative 

After the Plagues of Egypt, the Pharaoh agrees to let the Israelites go, and they travel from Ramesses to Succoth and then to Etham on the edge of the desert, led by a pillar of cloud by day and a pillar of fire by night. There God tells Moses to turn back and camp by the sea at Pi-HaHiroth, between Migdol and the sea, directly opposite Baal-zephon.

God causes the Pharaoh to pursue the Israelites with chariots, and the pharaoh overtakes them at Pi-hahiroth. When the Israelites see the Egyptian army they are afraid, but the pillar of fire and the cloud separates the Israelites and the Egyptians. At God's command, Moses held his hand out over the water, and throughout the night a strong east wind divided the sea, and the Israelites walked through on dry land with a wall of water on either side (Exodus 14:21&22). The Egyptians pursued them, but at daybreak God clogged their chariot-wheels and threw them into a panic, and with the return of the water, the pharaoh and his entire army are destroyed. When the Israelites saw the power of God, they put their faith in God and in Moses, and sang a song of praise to the Lord for the crossing of the sea and the destruction of their enemies.

The narrative contains at least three and possibly four layers. In the first layer (the oldest), God blows the sea back with a strong east wind, allowing the Israelites to cross on dry land; in the second, Moses stretches out his hand and the waters part in two walls; in the third, God clogs the chariot wheels of the Egyptians and they flee (in this version the Egyptians do not even enter the water); and in the fourth, the Song of the Sea, God casts the Egyptians into tehomot, the oceanic depths or mythical abyss.

Location 

The Israelites' first journey is from Ramesses to Succoth. Ramesses is generally identified with modern Qantir, the site of the 19th dynasty capital Per-Ramesses, and Succoth with Tell el-Maskhuta in Wadi Tumilat, the biblical Land of Goshen. From Succoth, the Israelites travel to Etham "on the edge of the desert", then turn back to Pi-HaHiroth, located between Migdol and the sea and directly opposite Baal-zephon. None of these have been identified with certainty. One theory with a wide following is that they refer collectively to the region of Lake Timsah, a salt lake north of the Gulf of Suez, and the nearest large body of water after Wadi Tumilat. Lake Timsah was connected to Pithom in Gesem at various times by a canal, and a late 1st millennium text refers to Migdol Baal Zephon as a fort on the canal.

The Hebrew term for the place of the crossing is Yam Suph. Although this has traditionally been thought to refer to the salt water inlet located between Africa and the Arabian peninsula, known in English as the Red Sea, this is a mistranslation from the Greek Septuagint, and Hebrew suph never means "red" but rather sometimes means "reeds". (While it is not relevant to the identification of the body of water, suph also puns on the Hebrew suphah ("storm") and soph ("end"), referring to the events of the Exodus).

It is unknown for certain why the Septuagint scholars translated Yam Suph Eruthra Thalassa or Red Sea. One theory is that these scholars, who lived in Alexandria, Egypt during the 3rd century BC, specifically identified the Red Sea as we know it today because they believed this is where the crossing took place.

General scholarly opinion is that the Exodus story combines a number of traditions, one of them at the "Reed Sea" (Lake Timsah, with the Egyptians defeated when the wheels of their chariots become clogged) and another at the far deeper Red Sea, allowing the more dramatic telling of events.

Reeds tolerant of salt water flourish in the shallow string of lakes extending from Suez north to the Mediterranean Sea. Kenneth Kitchen and James Hoffmeier state that these reedy lakes and marshes along the isthmus of Suez are acceptable locations for yam suf. The ancient yam suf is not confined to the modern Red Sea. Hoffmeier equates yam suf with the Egyptian term pa-tjufy (also written p3 twfy) from the Ramsside period, which refers to lakes in the eastern Nile delta. He also describes references to p3 twfy in the context of the Island of Amun, thought to be modern Tell el-Balamun. Tell el-Balamun was the most northerly city of Pharaonic Egypt about 29 km southwest of Damietta, located at 31.2586 North, 31.5714 East.

Historicity

No archaeological, scholar-verified evidence has been found that supports a crossing of the Red Sea. Zahi Hawass, an Egyptian archaeologist and formerly Egypt's Minister of State for Antiquities Affairs, reflected scholarly consensus when he said of the Exodus story, which is the biblical account of the Israelites’ flight from Egypt and subsequent 40 years of wandering the desert in search of the Promised Land: "Really, it’s a myth... Sometimes as archaeologists we have to say that never happened because there is no historical evidence."

Given the lack of evidence for the biblical account, some have searched for explanations as to what may have inspired the biblical authors' narrative, or to provide a natural explanation. One explanation is that the Israelites and Egyptians experienced a mirage, a commonly occurring natural phenomenon in deserts (and mirages themselves may have been considered supernatural). Each group may have believed the other to have been submerged in water, resulting in the Egyptians assuming the Israelites drowned and thus called off the pursuit. Some have claimed that the parting of the Red Sea and the Plagues of Egypt were natural events caused by a single natural disaster, a huge volcanic eruption on the Greek island of Santorini in the 16th century BC. Another proposal is that a land path through the Eastern Nile Delta was created by a wind setdown.

As noted above, the translation of the original Hebrew phrase Yam Suph as "Red Sea" remains dubious.

In Christianity
1 Corinthians 10:2 connect the Red Sea crossing to Christian baptism when it says "all were baptized into Moses in the cloud and in the sea". The Belgic Confession of the Reformed churches takes this further and says that baptism signifies that we are sprinkled by the "precious blood of the Son of God; who is our Red Sea, through which we must pass, to escape the tyranny of Pharaoh, that is, the devil, and to enter into the spiritual land of Canaan."

In Islam 

Muslims believe the crossing of a sea led by Mūsā to free the descendants of Israel from the Egyptian tyrant certainly did happen. As per Allah's command Moses came to the court of Pharaoh to warn him for his transgressions. Mūsā clearly manifested the proof of prophethood and claimed to let Israelites go with him. The Magicians of Pharaoh's cities, whom he gathered to prove to the people that the person claiming to be prophet is a magician; eventually they all believed in Mūsā. This enraged Pharaoh. But he couldn't frighten them in any way. Later they were pursued by Pharaoh and his army at sunrise. But Allah revealed to Mūsā beforehand to leave with His servants at night, for they will be pursued. The Quranic account about the moment:

Miraculously, Allah divided the waters of the sea leaving a dry path in the middle, which the Children of Israel immediately followed. Pharaoh and his soldiers went so audacious as to chase the Children of Israel into the sea. Here was an apparent miracle; without question. Nevertheless, this miracle did not suffice to convince Pharaoh. Together with his soldiers who deviantly took him as a deity (by obeying him against the prophet of Allah), he blindly entered the path that divided the sea. However, after the Children of Israel had safely crossed to the other side, the waters suddenly began to close in on Pharaoh and his soldiers and they all drowned. Though, at the last moment, Pharaoh tried to repent, his repentance was not accepted:

Every year Muslims fast two days in the month of Muharram commemorating the event.

Legacy
The theme of Moses crossing the Red Sea was taken up by the panegyrists of Constantine the Great and applied to the battle of the Milvian Bridge (312). The theme enjoyed a vogue during the fourth century on carved sarcophagi: at least twenty-nine have survived in full or in fragments. Eusebius of Caesarea cast Maxentius, drowned in the Tiber, in the role of Pharaoh, both in his Ecclesiastical History and in his eulogistic Life of Constantine.

See also
 The Prince of Egypt
 The Crossing of the Red Sea (Sistine Chapel)
 The Crossing of the Red Sea (Bronzino)
The Ten Commandments (1956 film)
Pi-HaHiroth
 Moses in Islam
 Mount Sinai
 Patterns of Evidence
 Passover
 Ashura

References

External links

 ABZU
 ARCHNet Near East Resources List
 Fitzwilliam Museum Egyptology Resources 
 Theban Mapping Project
 A collection of articles on the splitting of the Red Sea from a Jewish viewpoint

Red Sea
Jewish miracles
Moses
Red Sea
Water and religion
Yam Suph